Statistics of Soviet Top League for the 1977 season.

Overview
It was contested by 16 teams, and Dynamo Kyiv won the championship.

League standings

Results

Top scorers
17 goals
 Oleg Blokhin (Dynamo Kyiv)

14 goals
 David Kipiani (Dinamo Tbilisi)

12 goals
 Yuri Chesnokov (CSKA Moscow)

10 goals
 Andrei Yakubik (Dynamo Moscow)

9 goals
 Yuri Reznik (Shakhtar)
 Nikolai Smolnikov (Neftchi)
 Vitali Starukhin (Shakhtar)

8 goals
 Revaz Chelebadze (Dinamo Tbilisi)
 Vladimir Klementyev (Zenit)

7 goals
 Yuri Dubrovny (Karpaty)
 Vladimir Kazachyonok (Dynamo Moscow)
 Boris Kopeikin (CSKA Moscow)
 Khoren Hovhannisyan (Ararat)
 Vyacheslav Semyonov (Zorya Voroshylovhrad)

References
Soviet Union - List of final tables (RSSSF)

1969
1
Soviet
Soviet